Sarath Das (born 25 July 1978) is an Indian actor and dubbing artist who works in Malayalam films and television. He is known for his role as Lord Krishna in the serial Sree Mahabhagavatham telecasted on Asianet. He has been in the screens for over twenty five years. He received the Kerala State Film Award for Best Dubbing Artist twice.

Early life 
Sarath Das was born in Aluva to the prominent Kathakali singer Kalamandalam Haridas and Saraswathi. But, most of his life was spent in Thiruvananthapuram, where his father got settled. Sarath right from his childhood was trained in Mridangam and violin. He studied in NSS School, Perunthanni, Thiruvananthapuram. He is married to Manju Sarath and has two children. He has a younger brother named Harith Das.

Career
Sarath's first film Swaham was released in 1994 in which he had the opportunity to act with his father. Later, he got a handful of opportunities including the evergreen hits like Ennu Swantham Janakikutty, Madhuranombarakattu, Indriyam, Devadoothan, Natturajavu and Pathram.

Later, he appeared in miniscreens where he acted in more than 100 television serials. Hence, he became a familiar face to the audience from Kerala. The most remarkable role acted by Sarath in television was that of Lord Krishna in the serial Sree Mahabhagavatham telecasted in Asianet. He was widely recognised throughout Kerala through this serial.

He performed lead roles in many television operas including Manasu, Harichandanam, Alavudeente Albhuthavilakku and Amma. He has also acted in Minnukettu, Sree Guruvayurappan, Manasaputhri, Autograph and many more.

Sarath is currently acting in the serial Bhramanam in which he portrays a character with negative shades.

Apart from acting, Sarath is also familiar as a dubbing artist. He has dubbed the voice of actor Sidharth Bharathan in the movie Nammal. He has also dubbed for [Aravind Akash] in the movie Koottu. He has lent voice to other prominent actors including Unni Mukundan, Sidharth Lama, Bala, Narain, Nishan and many more. He has also dubbed in the Malayalam versions of many famous Telugu films like Happy Days, Ithu Njangalude Lokam etc., and Kannada films Ishtam Enikkishtam, and James, where he dubbed for Puneeth Rajkumar. He has received  Kerala State Film Award for Best Dubbing Artist for the film Achuvinte Amma in the year 2006.

Filmography

Films

|2022
|Kunjamminis Hospital
|
|}

As Dubbing Artist

Television

Partial list of television series

As host
Rangoli
Zoom In

Awards

Kerala State Film Award

 2005: Kerala State Film Award for Best Dubbing Artist for the film Achuvinte Amma 
 2017: Kerala State Film Award for Best Dubbing Artist for the film Edavappathy

Asianet Television Awards

2011: Asianet Television Awards 2011 for Most Popular Actor for the serial Harichandanam
 2012: Asianet Television Awards 2012 for Best Star Pair for the serial Amma
2014: Asianet Television Awards 2014 for Most Popular Actor for the serial Amma

References

External links 
 

Male actors in Malayalam cinema
Living people
People from Aluva
1978 births